Pamphinette "Pam" Buisa (born 28 December 1996) is a Canadian rugby union and sevens player.

Career
Buisa won a gold medal at the 2019 Pan American Games as a member of the Canada women's national rugby sevens team. Alongside teammates Caroline Crossley and Charity Williams, Buisa represents the national women's sevens team on the Rugby Canada Black, Indigenous, and People of Colour Working Group which was established on July 17, 2020.

In June 2021, Buisa was named to Canada's 2020 Summer Olympics team. She competed for Canada at the 2022 Rugby World Cup Sevens in Cape Town. They placed sixth overall after losing to Fiji in the fifth place final.

Buisa was added to Canada's fifteens team to the 2021 Rugby World Cup after Laura Russell was ruled out due to injury.

References

1996 births
Living people
Black Canadian sportswomen
Canada international rugby sevens players
Female rugby sevens players
Rugby sevens players at the 2019 Pan American Games
Pan American Games gold medalists for Canada
Pan American Games medalists in rugby sevens
Sportspeople from Victoria, British Columbia
Medalists at the 2019 Pan American Games
Rugby sevens players at the 2020 Summer Olympics
Rugby sevens players at the 2014 Summer Youth Olympics
Olympic rugby sevens players of Canada
Youth Olympic silver medalists for Canada
Canada international women's rugby sevens players
Rugby sevens players at the 2022 Commonwealth Games
Canadian female rugby union players
Canada women's international rugby union players